Nordic Regional Airlines Oy (abbreviated as Norra and often stylised as N°RRA, previously Flybe Nordic) is a Finnish regional airline based on the grounds of Helsinki Airport. Norra is owned as a joint venture by Finnair, Finland's flag carrier, and Danish Air Transport.

The airline began operations as Flybe Nordic on 20 October 2011 as a joint venture between Flybe and Finnair, following their acquisition of Finncomm Airlines. Flybe sold its 60% to Finnair as a temporary solution at a price of one euro (€1) in March 2015, which was sold three years later to Danish Air Transport. The airline has operated under Finnair's flight code since 1 May 2015. The company's head office and operations centre is located in Vantaa, Finland, while the office in Seinäjoki houses the company's financial division.

History

The creation of the airline was announced on 1 July 2011, when Flybe and Finnair revealed plans to jointly purchase Finncomm Airlines (FCA) and rebrand the airline Flybe Nordic, with Flybe and Finnair each holding a stake in the new airline. Under the terms of the agreement, the purchase price of Finncomm was €25 million, of which Flybe would pay €12 million and Finnair €13 million. Flybe has a majority stake in Flybe Nordic, holding a 60% stake in the airline, with Finnair holding the remaining 40%; Flybe has three seats on the airline's board of directors with Finnair having the other two.  Flybe planned to invest a total of €23.6 million into the new airline, including expenses such as loan repayments in addition to the purchase price of FCA.

At the time of the announcement of Flybe Nordic's creation, Flybe planned to begin operating the new airline on 1 August 2011, with the FCA name being phased out, though the start date was later pushed back to 30 October. A new route network was also planned to be announced in mid-August.

In November 2014, Flybe announced that it would sell its 60% stake in the airline for €1 in an effort to reduce group costs. In February 2015, the Finnish Competition and Consumer Authority approved the sale of its stake (60%) to StaffPoint Holding and G.W. Sohlberg. Flybe sold its share to Finnair as a temporary solution in March 2015. The airline has operated under Finnair's flight code since 1 May 2015. In May 2015, Flybe Nordic was rebranded as Nordic Regional Airlines.

Destinations

Codeshare agreements
As of November 2014, the airline has codeshare agreements with the following airlines:

 Air France 
 British Airways 
 Etihad Airways 
 Finnair 
 KLM

Fleet

Current fleet
Nordic Regional Airlines's fleet consists of the following aircraft (as of August 2019):

Historic fleet

Subsidiaries

Flybe Finland Ground
In April 2013, it was announced that Flybe Finland Ground will be established to provide ground services to Flybe operations in Finland. This business will initially focus on Helsinki Airport where it will develop services to support Flybe's own operations. In the future, Flybe Finland Ground will also offer ground services to other airlines in Finland and overseas.

Flybe Finland Maintenance
The former Finnish Aircraft Maintenance has operated as Flybe Finland Maintenance since April 2013. It provides maintenance services for regional aircraft, in particular ATR 72 aircraft at Helsinki Airport.

References

External links

 Official website

2011 establishments in Finland
Airlines of Finland
Airlines established in 2011
Finnair
Oneworld affiliate members
Finnish companies established in 2011